Pacificibacter aestuarii is a Gram-negative, strictly aerobic and non-motile bacterium from the genus of Pacificibacter which has been isolated from tidal flat sediments from Korea.

References

External links
Type strain of Pacificibacter aestuarii at BacDive -  the Bacterial Diversity Metadatabase

Rhodobacteraceae
Bacteria described in 2017